Man Power is a lost 1927 American comedy silent film directed by Clarence G. Badger and written by Ray Harris, Louise Long, George Marion Jr., Sam Mintz and Byron Morgan. The film stars Richard Dix and features Mary Brian, Philip Strange, Charles Hill Mailes, Oscar Smith and George Irving. The film was released on July 9, 1927, by Paramount Pictures.

Cast   
Richard Dix as Tom Roberts
Mary Brian as Alice Stoddard
Philip Strange as Randall Lewis
Charles Hill Mailes as Judson Stoddard
Oscar Smith as Ptomaine
George Irving as James Martin
Charles Clary as Albert Rollins
Charles Schaeffer as Reverend Guthrie

Production

The railroad scenes were filmed on the Sierra Railroad in Tuolumne County, California.

References

External links 
 
 

1927 films
1920s English-language films
Silent American comedy films
1927 comedy films
Paramount Pictures films
Films directed by Clarence G. Badger
American black-and-white films
Lost American films
American silent feature films
1927 lost films
Lost comedy films
1920s American films